Mikheil Meskhi (Georgian: მიხეილ მესხი; Russian: Михаил Шалвович Месхи; born 12 January 1937 in Tbilisi; died 22 April 1991 in Tbilisi) was a Georgian footballer. Nicknamed the "Georgian Garrincha" for his dazzling wing play, he was a creative force on the left flank for the Soviet Union. He was invited by the World XI side via the USSR Football Federation who replied he was injured and couldn't play— he was not told of the invitation.

Career
He started playing football at the age of 14 in Tbilisi. Local well-known specialist Archil Kiknadze was Meskhi's first coach. His unique football talent was soon obvious in the 35th Football Schoolboys team he played in.

During his career he played for Dynamo Tbilisi (1954–1969) and Lokomotiv Tbilisi (1970). He earned 35 caps for the USSR national football team, and participated in the 1962 World Cup.  He also appeared on the Soviet squad for the first-ever European Nations' Cup in 1960, which the Soviets won.

In 1998, Meskhi was voted the best player in the history of Georgian football, and a member of the 20th-century Georgian "Dream Team."

References

External links
 
  Photo Archive at National Parliamentary Library of Georgia
  Profile at Biographical Dictionary of Georgia
  Profile at Biographical Dictionary of Georgian Athletes 
  Mikheil Meskhi at FC Dinamo Tbilisi official website
  Profile and Statistics at Dinamo-Tbilisi.ru
  Biography at Biograph.ru
  Profile and Statistics at FootballFacts.ru
  Profile and Statistics at Rusteam.Permian.ru

1937 births
1991 deaths
Footballers from Georgia (country)
Soviet footballers
Soviet Union international footballers
Honoured Masters of Sport of the USSR
1962 FIFA World Cup players
1960 European Nations' Cup players
UEFA European Championship-winning players
FC Dinamo Tbilisi players
Meskhetians
Association football wingers